Alcterogystia is a genus of moths in the family Cossidae.

Species
 Alcterogystia frater (Warnecke, 1929)
 Alcterogystia l-nigra

Former species
 Alcterogystia cadambae
 Alcterogystia nilotica

Etymology
The genus name is derived from Greek  (meaning protector) plus  (an anagram of the genus-name Stygia).

References

 , 1990: A Phylogenetic study on Cossidae (Lepidoptera: Ditrysia) based on external adult morphology. Zoologische Verhandelingen 263: 1–295. Full article: .

Cossinae
Moth genera